Atlético Veragüense is a Panamanian football team playing in the Liga Panameña de Fútbol. It is based in Santiago de Veraguas in Veraguas province. Its home stadium is Estadio Aristocles Castillo. The team was previously known as La Primavera.

History

In 2002, La Primavera beat Expreso Bocas (from the Bocas del Toro Province) 2–1 to earn promotion to the Liga Panameña de Fútbol for the first time.

In 2003, the team was renamed Atlético Veragüense.  Under their new name, they lasted in the top flight until Clausura 2011, when they were relegated.

They returned after Clausura 2016, replacing Chepo F.C. (which had folded).

Notable players

Honours
Liga Nacional de Ascenso: 1
2002

Historical list of coaches
 Virgilio Rodríguez (2005–2006)
 José Alfredo Poyatos (2006)
 Virgilio Rodríguez (2007–2009)
 Roger Gómez (Oct 2009–2010)
 Eduardo Flores (Apr 2010–)
 Marcos Pimentel (June 2016 - August 2016)
 Andrés Domínguez (September 2016 - June 2017)
 Edgar Ramírez (June 2017 - )
 Marcos Pimentel (December 2017 - March 2018)
 Javier Reales (March 2018 - )

References

External links
 

Football clubs in Panama
Association football clubs established in 2003
2003 establishments in Panama
Santiago de Veraguas